The Democratic Union (DEMOS) is a political party in Republika Srpska, Bosnia and Herzegovina. Its leader is Nedeljko Čubrilović, the former Speaker of the National Assembly of Republika Srpska.

History
The Democratic Union was founded by Nedeljko Čubrilović on 22 December 2018, the former Speaker of the National Assembly of Republika Srpska, who left the Democratic People's Alliance in November 2018.

List of presidents

Electoral results

Parliamentary elections

See also
List of political parties in Republika Srpska

References

External links
Official Website

Political parties in Bosnia and Herzegovina
Serb political parties in Bosnia and Herzegovina
Political parties in Republika Srpska
Political parties established in 2018
2018 establishments in Bosnia and Herzegovina